Joyce Feng is a Taiwanese politician. She was a Minister without Portfolio of the Executive Yuan (1 August 2013 - 19 May 2016), supervising social welfare operations.

Taiwan Girls' Day inauguration
Speaking at the inauguration ceremony of Taiwan Girls' Day in Taipei on 11 October 2013, Feng said that the development underscored the commitment of the ROC government to creating a friendly environment for girls and pursuing gender equality, which is in line with the International Day of the Girl Child adopted by the United Nations in 2011.

References

Political office-holders in the Republic of China on Taiwan
Living people
Year of birth missing (living people)